Evstafii Zakharovich Tatanashvili (20 August 1902 – 30 September 1958) was a Soviet Air Force Major general. In 1941 he was the Commanding Officer of the 60th Mixed Aviation Division. Between 1942 and 1945 he led the 234th Fighter Aviation Division during the Great Patriotic War.

References 

Soviet military personnel of World War II
People of World War II from Georgia (country)
Soviet Air Force generals
Soviet major generals
1902 births
1958 deaths
Recipients of the Order of Suvorov, 2nd class
Recipients of the Order of Kutuzov, 2nd class
Recipients of the Order of Alexander Nevsky
Soviet Georgian generals